The DARE (Djibouti Africa Regional Express) submarine communications cable is a planned cable system along the east coast of Africa between Tanzania and Yemen managed by a consortium of 7 operators.

DARE1 consortium

Current members of the consortium are:
 Djibouti Telecom
 Somtel Group

Topology

The ACE system uses wavelength division multiplexing (WDM) technology, which is currently the most advanced for submarine cables. With WDM, cable capacity can be increased without additional submarine work. With an overall potential capacity of 5.12 Tbit/s, the system will support the 40 Gbit/s technology from its launch.

Landing points
The cable landing points are planned to be in the following countries and territories:
 Dar es Salaam, Tanzania
 Mombasa, Kenya
 Mogadishu, Somalia
 Bossaso, Puntland
 Berbera, Somaliland
 Mocha, Yemen
 Socotra, Yemen
 Djibouti

See also 
List of international submarine communications cables

Individual cable systems off the east coast of Africa include:

 TEAMS
 Seacom

References

Submarine communications cables in the Indian Ocean